is a railway station on the two lines of the Osaka Metro in Nippombashi Itchome, Chūō-ku, Osaka, Japan.

Lines

 (K17)
 (S17)
 Namba Line (Kintetsu Nippombashi Station)

Layout
The station has side platforms serving two tracks for the Sakaisuji Line on the first basement, and an island platform serving two tracks for the Sennichimae Line on the second basement. Ticket gates are located on the first basement on the platforms for the Sakaisuji Line.
Sakaisuji Line

Sennichimae Line

Surroundings
Namba Walk
Kuromon Ichiba
National Bunraku Theatre
Dotombori River
Nippombashi Bridge

Bus route
Nippombashi Itchome (Osaka City Bus)
Route 73 for Namba / for Deto Bus Terminal via Uehommachi Rokuchome and Kumata

Stations next to Nippombashi

|-
!colspan=5|Osaka Metro

External links
  Nippombashi Station - Sakaisuji Line from Osaka Metro website
  Nippombashi Station - Sakaisuji Line from Osaka Metro website
  Nippombashi Station - Sennichimae Line from Osaka Metro website
  Nippombashi Station - Sennichimae Line from Osaka Metro website

Chūō-ku, Osaka
Railway stations in Osaka
Railway stations in Japan opened in 1969
Osaka Metro stations